William Curtis Bryson (born August 19, 1945) is a Senior United States circuit judge of the United States Court of Appeals for the Federal Circuit. He also served a 7-year term as a judge on the United States Foreign Intelligence Surveillance Court of Review, until 2018, and on September 1, 2013, became the presiding judge of that court.

Early life and education

Born in Houston, Texas, Bryson graduated from St. John's School in 1963 and went on to receive his Artium Baccalaureus degree magna cum laude from Harvard University in 1969 and his Juris Doctor from the University of Texas School of Law in 1973. After graduating from law school, Bryson clerked for Judge Henry J. Friendly at the United States Court of Appeals for the Second Circuit. Following his clerkship with Judge Friendly, he clerked for Justice Thurgood Marshall at the United States Supreme Court.

Career

At the United States Department of Justice he served successively as Assistant to the United States Solicitor General, from 1978 to 1979; Chief, Appellate Section of the United States Department of Justice Criminal Division, from 1979 to 1982; Special Counsel, Organized Crime and Racketeering Section in the Criminal Division from 1982 to 1986 (where he received the Attorney General's Award for Exceptional Service in 1984); Deputy United States Solicitor General, from 1986 to 1994; and Deputy Associate United States Attorney General (Acting Associate United States Attorney General) in 1994. Judge Bryson is among the most prolific writers on the subject of government contracts. In 2010, he was the only federal circuit judge to write more than two government contract related opinions.

Federal judicial service

On June 22, 1994, Bryson was nominated by President Bill Clinton to a seat on the United States Court of Appeals for the Federal Circuit vacated by Judge Howard Thomas Markey. Bryson was confirmed by the United States Senate on September 28, 1994, and received his commission the following day. Bryson assumed senior status on January 7, 2013.

Personal life
Bryson is married to Julia Penny Clark, an attorney specializing in labor law and employee benefits. They met in law school, and clerked together at the U.S. Supreme Court. They have two daughters.

See also
 List of law clerks of the Supreme Court of the United States (Seat 10)

Bibliography

Notes

References
 

1945 births
Harvard University alumni
Judges of the United States Court of Appeals for the Federal Circuit
Law clerks of the Supreme Court of the United States
Living people
People from Houston
United States court of appeals judges appointed by Bill Clinton
University of Texas School of Law alumni
Judges of the United States Foreign Intelligence Surveillance Court of Review
St. John's School (Texas) alumni
20th-century American judges